Bocchoris labarinthalis is a moth of the family Crambidae. It can be found in Nigeria.

References

Endemic fauna of Nigeria
Moths described in 1912
Spilomelinae
Insects of West Africa
Moths of Africa